Plaza Fuerza Aérea Argentina (Spanish for "Argentine Air Force Square") is a square located in the barrio (district) of Retiro in Buenos Aires, Argentina. The square is located between the Retiro railway station on Avenida Dr. José María Ramos Mejía, Avenida San Martín and Avenida del Libertador. It was designed and built in the 1940s and inaugurated on January 4, 1945. Originally called Plaza Británica ("British Square"), its name was changed in 1982 to the current one, by paying homage to the Argentine Air Force after the Falklands War, which was its first war against an external enemy. However, some still refer to it by its old name and also Plaza de los Ingleses ("English Square"), although the latter name was never used officially. The Torre Monumental (formerly "Torre de los Ingleses"), is located in the center of the square.

References

Fuerza Aérea Argentina
Fuerza Aérea Argentina